The Seaford railway line is a suburban commuter line in Adelaide, South Australia.

History
Before the extension of the line to Noarlunga Centre in 1978, the Willunga line ran from Hallett Cove station on a different route through Reynella, Morphett Vale and Hackham to Willunga (south-east of Noarlunga). It closed in 1969 and in September 1972 a track-removal train removed the tracks, and for six years Noarlunga had no train service.

The South Australian Railways and its successor, the State Transport Authority, extended the current railway southwards in stages from Hallett Cove to cater for increasing residential development in the southern area. Opening dates for passenger services were: Hallett Cove Beach on 30 June 1974; Christie Downs on 25 January 1976 (This was a temporary terminus just north of Beach Road and adjacent to Hyacinth Crescent, and was in a different location to the current Christie Downs station, which opened in November 1981.); and Noarlunga Centre on 2 April 1978.

Prior to 2014, most trains were operated by 3000 class railcars augmented at times by 2000 class railcars. Since the electrification of the line, the latter are no longer authorised to operate on the line. Most services are now operated by A-City electric multiple units. A number of railcars needed for peak-hour services are now stabled overnight in secure sidings at Port Stanvac, north of Lonsdale station, and at a much bigger facility adjacent to Seaford Meadows. The last freight trains on the line, to and from Port Stanvac Refinery, ceased in the late 1990s.

Re-sleepering and electrification
In 2008, the State Government announced a plan to upgrade and electrify the Seaford line with the Federal Government also to provide funding. In December 2009, Stage 1 of the Noarlunga line upgrade was completed between Adelaide and Brighton. This work saw the track removed, with the track bed and track renewed. Dual gauge sleepers were laid to allow for the line to be converted to standard gauge at a future date. Stage 2 commenced in February 2011 with the line closed for six months and continued the upgrade works between Oaklands and Noarlunga. Most stations (Brighton, Seacliff, Marino, Marino Rocks and Lonsdale) received a minor upgrade due to the presence of asbestos in many station shelters, necessitating their replacement.

On 2 January 2013, the line closed to allow for its electrification and extension, with trains being replaced by bus services. Rail services resumed on 1 December 2013. The completed project was opened by the South Australian Transport and Infrastructure Minister Tom Koutsantonis on 18 January 2014. Electric train services commenced in February 2014 after testing was completed on the line. At the time, only four A-City electric multiple units had entered service, so most services continued to be operated by 3000 class railcars.

Seaford extension

In 2005, the State Government announced the line would be extended  to the southern suburb of Seaford. The plan was cancelled in December 2007 after a study concluded that the extension could not be justified. The government announced that it would retain the corridor to Aldinga for a possible extension further south in the future. In July 2008, a feasibility study was commissioned by the government into extending the line. This extension was given approval after the Federal Government announced a $291 million investment in the project as part of the 2009/10 Federal Budget.

Construction started in 2011 with the extension opening on 23 February 2014. The extension included a new  elevated rail bridge over the Onkaparinga River, a rail bridge over Old Honeypot Drive, and new railway stations at Seaford Meadows and Seaford. New road bridges were also constructed over the extension at Goldsmith Drive, Seaford Road and Lynton Terrace.

Future extension to Aldinga Beach
In 2019, Renewal SA delivered a Draft Structure Plan of a 94 hectare area of land in Aldinga which is set to include a new school and a train station.

Route
The line runs south from Adelaide station paralleling the Belair line as far as Goodwood. It then branches off in a south-west direction through the suburbs of Edwardstown, Oaklands Park and Marion to the coast at Brighton, where it turns south towards Noarlunga Centre in the southern suburbs. The line was known as the Marino and Hallett Cove line when it finished at Hallett Cove. Most trains terminated at Marino, with only about a quarter going to Hallett Cove.

Like the rest of the Adelaide network, the line is broad gauge. Dual gauge sleepers have been laid to allow for the line to be converted to standard gauge at a future date. The line is double track throughout. The Australian Rail Track Corporation standard-gauge main line passes over the line just south of Goodwood station, and the Flinders line branches off south of Woodlands Park.

Line guide

Former stations 
  – opened 1913, closed 2013.
  – closed 1994.
  – opened 2005 for seasonal use, closed 2013.
  – closed 1976.

Services 

Trains to and from Adelaide operate every 5–10 minutes during the weekday peak periods, every 10–20 minutes off-peak on weekdays, and every 30 minutes on weekends plus in the late evening. Previously, some stations were also serviced by trains from Brighton and from the Flinders branch line on weekdays.

Gallery

References

External links 
 Seaford to City - Adelaide Metro website

Railway lines in South Australia
Railway lines opened in 1978
Transport in Adelaide
1978 establishments in Australia